Berrias-et-Casteljau is a commune in the Ardèche department in southern France.

Geography
The Chassezac flows southeast through the northern part of the commune, then forms part of its eastern border.

The Berriasian Age of the Cretaceous Period of geological time is named for the village of Berrias in the commune.

Population

See also
Communes of the Ardèche department

References

Communes of Ardèche
 
Ardèche communes articles needing translation from French Wikipedia